Agapov (masculine) or Agapova (feminine) is a Russian surname. It derives from the given name Agap, which, in turn, is derived from the Greek verb meaning to love.

The following people share this surname:
Aleksandr Agapov (born 1982), Russian association football player
Anna Agapova, Russian figure skater participating in the Figure skating at the 2003 Winter Universiade and the 2002/2003 Russian Figure Skating Championships
Boris Agapov (1899-1973), Soviet writer
Boris Agapov, full cavalier of the Order for Service to the Homeland in the Armed Forces of the USSR
Galina Agapova, Russian geologist who named the undersea Kosminskaya Fracture Zone, Vinogradov Fracture Zone, Dubinin Trough, and Lazarev Trough
Gennadiy Agapov (Gennady Agapov), Soviet Olympic race walker participating in the 1970 IAAF World Race Walking Cup
Julia Agapova, a contestant on the Sweden's Next Top Model show
Konstantin Agapov, Russian futsal player who scored two goals in the 2008 FIFA Futsal World Cup
Larisa Agapova, birth name of Larisa Peleshenko (born 1964), retired Russian Olympic shot putter
Lyubov Agapova, actress who starred in Lilya 4-ever, a 2002 Swedish-Danish drama movie
Maksim Agapov (born 1988), Kyrgyzstani association football player
Mariya Agapova
Mykola Agapov, Ukrainian association football player for FC Desna Chernihiv
Nikolay Agapov, Russian auto racing driver participating in the 2007 European Touring Car Cup
Nina Agapova (1926–2021), Soviet and Russian actress
Olga Agapova, U23 Female member of the 2011 National Team of the Russian Triathlon Federation
Pavel Agapov, Russian basketball player participating in FIBA EuroCup Challenge
Pavel Agapov, U23 Male member of the 2011 National Team of the Russian Triathlon Federation
Pyotr Agapov, Head of the Ministry of Internal Affairs of the Karelian ASSR in 1959–1972
Sergey Agapov, Honored Test Pilot of the USSR
Sergey Agapov, "co-director" of Life in a Day, a 2011 crowdsourced drama/documentary movie
Svetlana Agapova, 1978 bronze winner at the Artistic Gymnastics World Cup – Women's balance beam
Vitaly Agapov, Soviet Ambassador to Benin in 1979–1985
Vladimir Agapov, several people
Yuri Agapov (Yury Agapov) (born 1980), Russian association football player

See also
Agapovo, a rural locality (a village) in Nytvensky District of Perm Krai, Russia
Agapovo, alternative name of Agashovo, a rural locality (a village) in Lodeynopolsky District of Leningrad Oblast, Russia

References

Notes

Sources
Ю. А. Федосюк (Yu. A. Fedosyuk). "Русские фамилии: популярный этимологический словарь" (Russian Last Names: a Popular Etymological Dictionary). Москва, 2006. 



Russian-language surnames